Trillium (trillium, wakerobin, toadshade, tri flower, birthroot, birthwort, and sometimes "wood lily") is a genus of about fifty flowering plant species in the family Melanthiaceae. Trillium species are native to temperate regions of North America and Asia, with the greatest diversity of species found in the southern Appalachian Mountains in the southeastern United States.

Description

Plants of this genus are perennial herbs growing from rhizomes. There are three large leaf-like bracts arranged in a whorl about a scape that rises directly from the rhizome. There are no true aboveground leaves but sometimes there are scale-like leaves on the underground rhizome. The bracts are photosynthetic and are sometimes called leaves. The inflorescence is a single flower with three green or reddish sepals and three petals in shades of red, purple, pink, white, yellow, or green. At the center of the flower there are six stamens and three stigmas borne on a very short style, if any. The fruit is fleshy and capsule-like or berrylike. The seeds have large, oily elaiosomes.

Occasionally individuals have four-fold symmetry, with four bracts (leaves), four sepals, and four petals in the blossom.. The tetramerous condition has been described for several species of Trillium including T. chloropetalum, T. erectum, T. grandiflorum, T. maculatum, T. sessile, and T. undulatum.

Taxonomy

In 1753, Swedish botanist Carl Linnaeus established the genus Trillium by recognizing three species, Trillium cernuum, Trillium erectum, and Trillium sessile. The type specimen Trillium cernuum described by Linnaeus was actually Trillium catesbaei, an oversight that subsequently led to much confusion regarding the type species of this genus.

Initially the Trillium genus was placed in the family Liliaceae. In the nineteenth and early twentieth centuries it was sometimes placed in a smaller family, Trilliaceae. By 1981 Liliaceae had grown to about 280 genera and 4,000 species. As it became clearer that the very large version of Liliaceae was polyphyletic, some botanists preferred to place Trillium and related genera into that separate family. Others defined a larger family, Melanthiaceae, for a similar purpose, but included several other genera not historically recognized as close relatives of Trillium. This latter approach was followed in 1998 by the Angiosperm Phylogeny Group, which assigned the genus Trillium, along with its closest relatives, Paris and Pseudotrillium, to the family Melanthiaceae. 
However, other taxonomists have since preferred to break up the heterogenous Melanthiaceae into several smaller monophyletic families, each with more coherent morphological features, returning Trillium to a resurrected Trilliaceae.

In 1850, German botanist Carl Sigismund Kunth segregated Trillium govanianum  into genus Trillidium. Some authorities consider Trillidium  to be a synonym for Trillium , while others recognize the taxon Trillidium govanianum  based on morphological differences (with other Trillium species) and molecular evidence. Still others support the segregation of Trillium undulatum  into genus Trillidium alongside Trillidium govanianum.

Infrageneric taxa

All names used in this section are taken from the International Plant Names Index. , Plants of the World Online (POWO) accepts 49 species and 5 named hybrids, all of which are listed below. The geographical locations are taken from POWO and the Flora of North America, except where noted.

Subgenera

The Trillium genus has traditionally been divided into two subgenera, Trillium subgenus Trillium and Trillium subgenus Sessilium, based on whether the flowers are pedicellate or sessile with respect to their attachment to the apex of the scape. The former is considered the more primitive group. Until recently the sessile-flowered subgenus was known by the name Phyllantherum, but the name Sessilium has precedence and should be used instead.  has been shown to be a monophyletic group by molecular systematics but its segregation renders the remaining  paraphyletic.

In 1830, Rafinesque placed Trillium catesbaei into subgenus Delostylium. Since then Trillium persistens and all members of the Trillium pusillum species complex (including Trillium georgianum and Trillium texanum) have been added to this subgenus, which has been shown to be monophyletic. Members of   are distinguished from other pedicellate-flowered trilliums by the presence of a definite style. The word Delostylium means "with a small but conspicuous style".

Phylogenetic analysis confirms the monophyly of Trillidium and supports the inclusion of Trillium undulatum into that genus. Excluding Trillium govanianum and Trillium undulatum from the analysis, genus Trillium can be separated into four major lineages:

 Erectum group (15 species)
 Grandiflorum group (3 species)
 Trillium  
 Trillium  

Since all four species groups are monophyletic, this leads to a four-part concept of Trillium that sharply contrasts with the traditional pedicellate vs. sessile dichotomy outlined previously.

Erectum group

This group of species has pedicellate flowers (on a short stalk) with three separate stigmas (no style) and solid green leaves (not mottled). Species in this group are distributed across North America and Asia, as indicated below. Hybrids are common within this group (the only group of pedicellate-flowered trilliums with natural hybrids).

 Trillium apetalon  – Japan, Kuril Islands, E Russia (Sakhalin)
 Trillium camschatcense  – NE China (Jilin), Japan, Korea, Kuril Islands, E Russia (Primorsky Krai, Khabarovsk Krai, Kamchatka Peninsula, Sakhalin)
 Trillium cernuum  – Manitoba, New Brunswick, Newfoundland, Nova Scotia, Ontario, Prince Edward Island, Quebec, Saskatchewan; Connecticut, Delaware, Illinois, Indiana, Iowa, Maine, Maryland, Massachusetts, Michigan, Minnesota, New Hampshire, New Jersey, New York, North Dakota, Ohio, Pennsylvania, Rhode Island, South Dakota, Vermont, Virginia, West Virginia, Wisconsin; Saint Pierre and Miquelon
 Trillium channellii  – Japan (E Hokkaido)
 Trillium erectum  – New Brunswick, Nova Scotia, Ontario, Quebec; Connecticut, Delaware, Georgia, Illinois, Indiana, Kentucky, Maine, Maryland, Massachusetts, Michigan, New Hampshire, New Jersey, New York, North Carolina, Ohio, Pennsylvania, Rhode Island, South Carolina, Tennessee, Vermont, Virginia, West Virginia
 Trillium flexipes  – Ontario; Alabama, Arkansas, Delaware, Illinois, Indiana, Iowa, Kentucky, Maryland, Michigan, Minnesota, Missouri, New York, Ohio, Pennsylvania, South Dakota, Tennessee, Virginia, West Virginia, Wisconsin
 Trillium × hagae  (Trillium camschatcense × Trillium tschonoskii) – Japan, E Russia (S Sakhalin)
 Trillium hibbersonii  – British Columbia
 Trillium × komarovii  (Trillium camschatcense × unknown) – Japan, E Russia (Primorsky Krai)
 Trillium × miyabeanum  (Trillium apetalon × Trillium tschonoskii) – Japan
 Trillium rugelii  – Alabama, Georgia, North Carolina, South Carolina, Tennessee
 Trillium simile  – Georgia, North Carolina, Tennessee
 Trillium smallii  – Japan, E Russia (S Sakhalin)
 Trillium sulcatum  – Alabama, Georgia, Kentucky, North Carolina, Tennessee, Virginia, West Virginia
 Trillium taiwanense  – E Taiwan
 Trillium tschonoskii  – Bhutan, China (Anhui, Fujian, Gansu, Hubei, Shaanxi, Sichuan, Tibet Autonomous Region, Yunnan, Zhejiang), NE India (Sikkim), Japan, Korea, Kuril Islands, Myanmar, Russia (Sakhalin), Taiwan
 Trillium vaseyi  – Alabama, Georgia, North Carolina, South Carolina, Tennessee
 Trillium × yezoense  (Trillium apetalon × Trillium camschatcense) – Japan

Grandiflorum group

This group of species has pedicellate flowers (on a short stalk) and solid green leaves (except T. ovatum on the west coast of California, which occasionally has mottled leaves). The stigmas are fused together at their bases (basally connate) but lack a definite style. Species in this group are distributed across North America (but not Asia). These flowers were and still are consumed and used by Native Americans in different regions of America.

 Trillium crassifolium  – Washington
 Trillium grandiflorum  – Nova Scotia, Ontario, Quebec; Alabama, Connecticut, Delaware, District of Columbia, Georgia, Illinois, Indiana, Iowa, Kentucky, Maine, Maryland, Massachusetts, Michigan, Minnesota, New Hampshire, New Jersey, New York, North Carolina, Ohio, Pennsylvania, South Carolina, Tennessee, Vermont, Virginia, West Virginia, Wisconsin
 Trillium nivale  – Illinois, Indiana, Iowa, Kentucky, Maryland, Michigan, Minnesota, Missouri, Nebraska, Ohio, Pennsylvania, South Dakota, West Virginia, Wisconsin
 Trillium ovatum  – Alberta, British Columbia; California, Colorado, Idaho, Montana, Oregon, Washington, Wyoming
 Trillium scouleri  – Alberta, British Columbia; Colorado, Idaho, Montana, Washington, Wyoming

Trillium subgenus Delostylium

This subgenus has pedicellate flowers (except for one variety of T. pusillum) with a definite style and solid green leaves (not mottled). Distribution is restricted to the southeastern and south central United States.

 Trillium catesbaei  – Alabama, Georgia, North Carolina, South Carolina, Tennessee
 Trillium georgianum  – Georgia
 Trillium persistens  – Georgia, South Carolina
 Trillium pusillum  – Alabama, Arkansas, Georgia, Kentucky, Louisiana, Maryland, Mississippi, Missouri, North Carolina, Oklahoma, South Carolina, Tennessee, Texas, Virginia, West Virginia

Trillium subgenus Sessilium

This subgenus (previously known as ) includes species with sessile flowers (no flower stalk), erect petals (except in T. stamineum), and mottled leaves (except in T. petiolatum and occasionally in plants of other sessile-flowered species).

 Trillium albidum  – California, Oregon, Washington
 Trillium angustipetalum  – California
 Trillium chloropetalum  – California
 Trillium cuneatum  – Alabama, Georgia, Kentucky, Mississippi, North Carolina, South Carolina, Tennessee
 Trillium decipiens  – Alabama, Florida, Georgia
 Trillium decumbens  – Alabama, Georgia, Tennessee
 Trillium delicatum  – Georgia
 Trillium discolor  – Georgia, North Carolina, South Carolina
 Trillium foetidissimum  – Louisiana, Mississippi
 Trillium gracile  – Louisiana, Texas
 Trillium kurabayashii  – California, Oregon
 Trillium lancifolium  – Alabama, Florida, Georgia, South Carolina, Tennessee
 Trillium ludovicianum  – Louisiana, Mississippi, Texas
 Trillium luteum  – District of Columbia, Georgia, Kentucky, North Carolina, Tennessee
 Trillium maculatum  – Alabama, Florida, Georgia, South Carolina
 Trillium oostingii  – South Carolina
 Trillium petiolatum  – Idaho, Oregon, Washington
 Trillium recurvatum  – Alabama, Arkansas, Illinois, Indiana, Iowa, Kentucky, Louisiana, Michigan, Mississippi, Missouri, Ohio, Tennessee, Texas, Wisconsin
 Trillium reliquum  – Georgia, South Carolina
 Trillium sessile  – Alabama, Arkansas, District of Columbia, Illinois, Indiana, Kansas, Kentucky, Maryland, Michigan, Missouri, New York, North Carolina, Ohio, Oklahoma, Pennsylvania, Tennessee, Virginia, West Virginia
 Trillium stamineum  – Alabama, Mississippi, Tennessee
 Trillium underwoodii  – Alabama, Florida, Georgia
 Trillium viride  – Illinois, Missouri
 Trillium viridescens  – Arkansas, Kansas, Missouri, Oklahoma, Texas

Ungrouped taxa

The following pair of taxa are widely accepted but do not fit into any of the above groups since they are markedly different from other Trillium species. There is evidence to support the segregation of these species into a separate genus (Trillidium) but the proposal is controversial.

 Trillium govanianum </ref> – NE Afghanistan, Bhutan, China (Tibet Autonomous Region, Yunnan), N + NE India (Himachal Pradesh, Jammu and Kashmir, Sikkim, Uttarakhand), Nepal, N Pakistan
 Trillium undulatum  – New Brunswick, Nova Scotia, Ontario, Prince Edward Island, Quebec; Connecticut, Georgia, Kentucky, Maine, Maryland, Massachusetts, Michigan, New Hampshire, New Jersey, New York, North Carolina, Ohio, Pennsylvania, Rhode Island, South Carolina, Tennessee, Vermont, Virginia, West Virginia

The following taxon is an intergeneric hybrid:

 Trillium × crockerianum  (Trillium ovatum × Pseudotrillium rivale) – California

Other taxa

, Plants of the World Online does not accept these taxa:

 Trillium texanum , also known as Trillium pusillum var. texanum , are considered by some authorities to be synonyms for Trillium pusillum var. pusillum.
 Trillium tennesseense  is considered by some authorities to be a synonym for Trillium lancifolium 
 Trillium parviflorum  is an accepted name by some authorities while others regard this name as a synonym of T. albidum subsp. parviflorum .

The following taxon is of historical interest:

 Trillium rivale  has been segregated to a monotypic genus as Pseudotrillium rivale .

Distribution

Trillium species are native to North America and Asia.

North America

More than three dozen Trillium species are found in North America, most of which are native to eastern North America. Just six species are native to western North America: T. albidum, T. angustipetalum, T. chloropetalum, T. kurabayashii, T. ovatum, and T. petiolatum. Of these, only T. ovatum is pedicellate-flowered.

Canada

Trillium species are found across Canada, from Newfoundland to southern British Columbia. The greatest diversity of species are found in Ontario, Quebec, and Nova Scotia.

 Alberta: T. ovatum, T. scouleri
 British Columbia: T. hibbersonii, T. ovatum, T. scouleri
 Manitoba: T. cernuum
 New Brunswick: T. cernuum, T. erectum, T. undulatum
 Newfoundland: T. cernuum
 Northwest Territories: none
 Nova Scotia: T. cernuum, T. erectum, T. grandiflorum, T. undulatum
 Nunavut: none
 Ontario: T. cernuum, T. erectum, T. flexipes, T. grandiflorum, T. undulatum
 Prince Edward Island: T. cernuum, T. undulatum
 Quebec: T. cernuum, T. erectum, T. grandiflorum, T. undulatum
 Saskatchewan: T. cernuum
 Yukon: none

United States

Except for the desert regions of the southwestern United States, Trillium species are found throughout the contiguous U.S. states. In the western United States, species are found from Washington to central California, east to the Rocky Mountains. In the eastern United States, species range from Maine to northern Florida, west to the Mississippi River valley. Trillium species are especially diverse in the southeastern United States, in Georgia, Tennessee, Alabama, North Carolina, and South Carolina. The state of Georgia is home to 21 species of trillium.

 Alabama: T. catesbaei, T. cuneatum, T. decipiens, T. decumbens, T. flexipes, T. grandiflorum, T. lancifolium, T. luteum, T. maculatum, T. pusillum, T. recurvatum, T. reliquum, T. rugelii, T. sessile, T. stamineum, T. sulcatum, T. underwoodii, T. vaseyi
 Alaska: none
 Arizona: none
 Arkansas: T. flexipes, T. pusillum, T. recurvatum, T. sessile, T. viridescens
 California: T. albidum, T. angustipetalum, T. chloropetalum, T. kurabayashii, T. ovatum
 Colorado: T. ovatum, T. scouleri
 Connecticut: T. cernuum, T. erectum, T. grandiflorum, T. undulatum
 Delaware: T. cernuum, T. erectum, T. flexipes, T. grandiflorum
 District of Columbia: T. grandiflorum, T. luteum, T. sessile
 Florida: T. decipiens, T. lancifolium, T. maculatum, T. underwoodii
 Georgia: T. catesbaei, T. cuneatum, T. decipiens, T. decumbens, T. delicatum, T. discolor, T. erectum, T. georgianum, T. grandiflorum, T. lancifolium, T. luteum, T. maculatum, T. persistens, T. reliquum, T. rugelii, T. simile, T. sulcatum, T. underwoodii, T. undulatum, T. vaseyi
 Hawaii: none
 Idaho: T. ovatum, T. petiolatum, T. scouleri
 Illinois: T. cernuum, T. erectum, T. flexipes, T. grandiflorum, T. nivale, T. recurvatum, T. sessile, T. viride
 Indiana: T. cernuum, T. erectum, T. flexipes, T. grandiflorum, T. nivale, T. recurvatum, T. sessile
 Iowa: T. cernuum, T. flexipes, T. grandiflorum, T. nivale, T. recurvatum
 Kansas: T. sessile, T. viridescens
 Kentucky: T. cuneatum, T. erectum, T. flexipes, T. grandiflorum, T. luteum, T. nivale, T. pusillum, T. recurvatum, T. sessile, T. sulcatum, T. undulatum
 Louisiana: T. foetidissimum, T. gracile, T. ludovicianum, T. pusillum (syn: T. texanum), T. recurvatum
 Maine: T. cernuum, T. erectum, T. grandiflorum, T. undulatum
 Maryland: T. cernuum, T. erectum, T. flexipes, T. grandiflorum, T. nivale, T. pusillum, T. sessile, T. undulatum
 Massachusetts: T. cernuum, T. erectum, T. grandiflorum, T. undulatum
 Michigan: T. cernuum, T. erectum, T. flexipes, T. grandiflorum, T. nivale, T. recurvatum, T. sessile, T. undulatum
 Minnesota: T. cernuum, T. flexipes, T. grandiflorum, T. nivale
 Mississippi: T. cuneatum, T. foetidissimum, T. ludovicianum, T. pusillum, T. recurvatum, T. stamineum
 Missouri: T. flexipes, T. nivale, T. pusillum, T. recurvatum, T. sessile, T. viride, T. viridescens
 Montana: T. ovatum, T. scouleri
 Nebraska: T. nivale
 Nevada: none
 New Hampshire: T. cernuum, T. erectum, T. grandiflorum, T. undulatum
 New Jersey: T. cernuum, T. erectum, T. grandiflorum, T. undulatum
 New Mexico: none
 New York: T. cernuum, T. erectum, T. flexipes, T. grandiflorum, T. sessile, T. undulatum
 North Carolina: T. catesbaei, T. cuneatum, T. discolor, T. erectum, T. grandiflorum, T. luteum, T. pusillum, T. rugelii, T. sessile, T. simile, T. sulcatum, T. undulatum, T. vaseyi
 North Dakota: T. cernuum
 Ohio: T. cernuum, T. erectum, T. flexipes, T. grandiflorum, T. nivale, T. recurvatum, T. sessile, T. undulatum
 Oklahoma: T. pusillum, T. sessile, T. viridescens
 Oregon: T. albidum, T. kurabayashii, T. ovatum, T. petiolatum
 Pennsylvania: T. cernuum, T. erectum, T. flexipes, T. grandiflorum, T. nivale, T. sessile, T. undulatum
 Rhode Island: T. cernuum, T. erectum, T. undulatum
 South Carolina: T. catesbaei, T. cuneatum, T. discolor, T. erectum, T. grandiflorum, T. lancifolium, T. maculatum, T. oostingii, T. persistens, T. pusillum, T. reliquum, T. rugelii, T. undulatum, T. vaseyi
 South Dakota: T. cernuum, T. flexipes, T. nivale
 Tennessee: T. catesbaei, T. cuneatum, T. decumbens, T. erectum, T. flexipes, T. grandiflorum, T. lancifolium, T. luteum, T. pusillum, T. recurvatum, T. rugelii, T. sessile, T. simile, T. stamineum, T. sulcatum, T. tennesseense, T. undulatum, T. vaseyi
 Texas: T. gracile, T. ludovicianum, T. pusillum (syn: T. texanum), T. recurvatum, T. viridescens
 Utah: none
 Vermont: T. cernuum, T. erectum, T. grandiflorum, T. undulatum
 Virginia: T. cernuum, T. erectum, T. flexipes, T. grandiflorum, T. pusillum, T. sessile, T. sulcatum, T. undulatum
 Washington: T. albidum, T. ovatum, T. petiolatum, T. scouleri
 West Virginia: T. cernuum, T. erectum, T. flexipes, T. grandiflorum, T. nivale, T. pusillum, T. sessile, T. sulcatum, T. undulatum
 Wisconsin: T. cernuum, T. flexipes, T. grandiflorum, T. nivale, T. recurvatum
 Wyoming: T. ovatum, T. scouleri

Other

 Saint Pierre and Miquelon: T. cernuum

Asia

In Asia, the range of Trillium species extends from the Himalayas across China, Korea, Japan, and eastern Russia to the Kuril Islands. The greatest diversity of Trillium species is found on the islands of Japan and Sakhalin.

 Afghanistan: T. govanianum
 Bhutan: T. govanianum, T. tschonoskii
 China: T. camschatcense (Jilin), T. govanianum (Tibet Autonomous Region, Yunnan), T. taiwanense (E Taiwan), T. tschonoskii (Anhui, Fujian, Gansu, Hubei, Shaanxi, Sichuan, Tibet Autonomous Region, Yunnan, Zhejiang)
 India: T. govanianum (Himachal Pradesh, Jammu and Kashmir, Sikkim, Uttarakhand), T. tschonoskii (Sikkim)
 Japan: T. apetalon, T. camschatcense, T. channellii (Hokkaido), T. smallii, T. tschonoskii, 
 Korea: T. camschatcense, T. tschonoskii
 Kuril Islands: T. apetalon, T. camschatcense, T. tschonoskii
 Myanmar: T. tschonoskii
 Nepal: T. govanianum
 Pakistan: T. govanianum
 Russia: T. apetalon (Sakhalin), T. camschatcense (Primorsky Krai, Khabarovsk Krai, Kamchatka Peninsula, Sakhalin),  (Sakhalin),  (Primorsky Krai), T. smallii (Sakhalin), T. tschonoskii (Sakhalin)
 Taiwan: T. taiwanense, T. tschonoskii

Identification

A fully general dichotomous key requires a mature, flowering plant. The first step is to determine whether or not the flower sits on a pedicel, which determines the subgenus. (Any mature plant may be identified to this extent, even if it is not in bloom.) Identification proceeds based on flower parts, leaves, and other characteristics. A combination of characteristics is usually required to identify the plant.

Identification of a non-flowering, non-fruiting plant with bare leaves may be difficult. Although some species of Trillium have petioles (leaf stalks) and/or distinctive leaf shapes, these features are seldom sufficient to identify the plant down to the species level.

In eastern North America, jack-in-the-pulpit (Arisaema triphyllum) is often mistaken for bare-leaved Trillium. Both species are about the same height with trifoliate leaves but the former lacks 3-way rotational symmetry and has leaf veins unlike those of Trillium.

Ecology

Trilliums are myrmecochorous, that is, ants act as agents of seed dispersal. Each seed of a ripe fruit has a white fleshy appendage called an elaiosome. Ants are attracted to the elaiosome, so much so they often bore holes into the fruit instead of waiting for it to drop off on its own. The ants carry the seeds back to their nest where they eat the elaiosomes and discard the seeds. Here the seeds eventually germinate, an average of about 1 meter away from the parent plant.

For example, the seeds of Trillium camschatcense and T. tschonoskii are collected by ant species Aphaenogaster smythiesi and Myrmica ruginodis. Sometimes beetles interfere with the dispersal process by eating the elaiosomes, which makes the seeds less attractive to ants.

Yellow jackets (Vespula spp.) and other wasps are similarly attracted to elaiosomes. The wasps carry off the seeds and feed on the elaiosomes an average of about 1.4 meters away from the parent plant. Yellow jackets are documented seed dispersers for at least three species of Trillium (T. catesbaei, T. cuneatum, T. undulatum).

Hybrids
, Plants of the World Online recognizes five named hybrids, four in Asia and one in North America. One of its parents is T. camschatcense but the other parent is unknown.

As originally described, its parents are Trillium ovatum and Trillium rivale, but the latter species is now a member of genus Pseudotrillium, and so  has become an intergeneric hybrid.

In 1982, Haga and Channell crossed the Asiatic species Trillium camschatcense with several North American species. Of those, the crosses with T. erectum, T. flexipes, and T. vaseyi produced solid, seemingly viable seed. Seeds of the cross between T. camschatcense and T. erectum flowered in 9 to 10 years.

Disease

Various Trillium species are susceptible to a greening disorder caused by bacterial organisms called phytoplasmas that alter the morphology of infected plants. Symptoms of phytoplasma infection include abnormal green markings on the petals (floral virescence), extra leaves (phyllody), and other abnormal characteristics. Infected populations occur throughout the species range but are prevalent in Ontario, Michigan, and New York.

For many years, this condition was thought to originate from mutation, and so many of these forms were given taxonomic names now known to be invalid. In 1971, Hooper, Case, and Meyers used electron microscopy to detect the presence of mycoplasma-like organisms (i.e., phytoplasmas) in T. grandiflorum with virescent petals. The means of transmission was not established but leafhoppers were suspected. , the insect vector for Trillium greening disorder is unknown.

Phytoplasmas were positively identified in T. grandiflorum and T. erectum in Ontario in 2016. Phylogenetic analysis supported the grouping of the phytoplasmas isolated from infected plants as a related strain of &apos;Candidatus Phytoplasma pruni&apos; (subgroup 16SrIII-F) with 99% sequence identity. This subgroup of phytoplasmas is associated with various other diseases, including milkweed yellows, Vaccinium witches' broom, and potato purple top.

Conservation

Picking parts off a trillium plant can kill it even if the rhizome is left undisturbed. Some species of trillium are listed as threatened or endangered and collecting these species may be illegal. Laws in some jurisdictions may restrict the commercial exploitation of trilliums and prohibit collection without the landowner's permission. In the US states of Michigan and Minnesota it is illegal to pick trilliums. In New York it is illegal to pick the red trillium.

In 2009, a Private Members Bill was proposed in the Ontario legislature that would have made it illegal to in any way injure the common Trillium grandiflorum (white trillium) in the province (with some exceptions), however the bill was never passed.  The rare Trillium flexipes (drooping trillium) is also protected by law in Ontario, because of its decreasing Canadian population.

High white-tailed deer population density has been shown to decrease or eliminate trillium in an area, particularly white trillium.

Some species are harvested from the wild to an unsustainable degree. This is particularly dire in the case of T. govanianum, whose high selling price as a folk medicine has motivated harvesters to destroy swathes of ecologically sensitive Himalayan forests, causing mudslides.

Medicinal uses

Several species contain sapogenins. They have been used traditionally as uterine stimulants, the inspiration for the common name birthwort. In a 1918 publication, Joseph E. Meyer called it "beth root", probably a corruption of "birthroot". He claimed that an astringent tonic derived from the root was useful in controlling bleeding and diarrhea.

Culture

The white trillium (Trillium grandiflorum) serves as the official flower and emblem of the Canadian province of Ontario. It is an official symbol of the Government of Ontario.  The large white trillium is the official wildflower of Ohio. In light of their shared connection to the flower, the Major League Soccer teams in Toronto and Columbus compete with each other for the Trillium Cup.

Citizen scientists regularly report observations of Trillium species from around the world. T. grandiflorum, T. erectum, and T. ovatum (in that order) are the most often observed Trillium species.

Trillium is the literary magazine of Ramapo College of New Jersey, which features poetry, fiction, photography, and other visual arts created by Ramapo students.

In Mexican LGBT culture, the trillium is included as a symbol on their version of the bisexual pride flag.

Gallery

References

Bibliography

External links

 Interactive Identification Key (Java)
 Utah Agricultural Experiment Station — Fact Sheets
 McKelvie, D. Woodland Plants: The Trillium. Ontario Woodlot Association.
 Biodiversity Information Serving Our Nation (BISON) occurrence data and maps for Trillium
 
 
 
 
 
 
 
 
 
 

 
Melanthiaceae genera
Flora of Canada
Flora of the United States